The 1921 Westminster Abbey by-election was a parliamentary by-election held on 25 August 1921 for the British House of Commons constituency of Westminster Abbey in London.  The seat had become vacant when the Conservative Member of Parliament (MP) William Burdett-Coutts had died on 28 July 1921. Burdett-Coutts had held the seat since it had been created for the 1918 general election, when he had been returned unopposed.

Candidates
The Unionist candidate was John Nicholson.
The Liberal candidate Arnold Lupton, aged nearly 75, had previously been a member of the House of Commons from 1906 to January 1910.

Campaign
At the time the Anti-Waste League was active, and all three candidates claimed to be anti-waste. The League was formed to advance the political ambitions of the newspaper owner Lord Rothermere. He is known in particular, with his brother Alfred Harmsworth, 1st Viscount Northcliffe, for the development of the  British newspapers Daily Mail and Daily Mirror - he was a pioneer of popular journalism.  The objects of the League were to insist upon measures being taken to restore the country to solvency, urge a wholesale reduction of expenditure, fight the battle of local rates and oppose sham Anti-Waste candidates. There was a growing element both inside and outside the Conservative element of the Coalition Government, that opposed the post-war reconstruction methods adopted by Lloyd George and other leading Liberals in the coalition, notably Christopher Addison, who as Housing Minister had introduced a series of measures to enable local councils to build Council houses. These measures were funded by higher taxation and in accordance with Lloyd George's aim to build a "Land Fit for Heroes".

Result
The Unionist candidate won the election, but the Anti-Waste League candidate Reginald Applin polled respectably.

Aftermath
Nicholson remained the constituency's MP until his death in 1924, when a further by-election was held. Applin became the Conservative MP for Enfield in 1924

References
 
 British Parliamentary Election Results 1918-1949, compiled and edited by F.W.S. Craig (The Macmillan Press 1979)
 Minor Parties at British Parliamentary Elections 1885-1974, compiled and edited by F.W.S. Craig (The Macmillan Press 1975)

External links
 Newsreel footage of the three candidates handing in their nomination papers, British Pathé

1921 elections in the United Kingdom
By-elections to the Parliament of the United Kingdom in London constituencies
Elections in the City of Westminster
1921 in London
1920s in the City of Westminster